Smirke is a surname. Notable people with the surname include:

Charlie Smirke, British jockey
Edward Smirke (1795–1875), English lawyer and antiquary
Robert Smirke (painter)
Robert Smirke (architect), son of Robert Smirke the painter
Sydney Smirke, son of Robert Smirke the painter